Ekaltadeta jamiemulvaneyi is a species of potoroid marsupial that existed in later periods of Miocene Australia.

Taxonomy
The description of Ekaltadeta jamiemulvaneyi was assigned to a new genus Ekaltadeta by Stephen Wroe in 1996, assigning it to the genus erected for another species. The author reviewed the phylogeny of Ekaltadeta and gave a revised description of the genus.

The specific epithet jamiemulvaneyi refers to an honour given to J. Mulvaney as a supporter of the Riversleigh Society. The generic name means "powerful tooth".

Description 
Ekaltadeta jamiemulveneyi describes a very large species of the propleopine group.

Distribution 
A species of Riversleigh fauna, only known from that area in the north of Queensland. The specimens used in the first description were obtained at two sites in the Riversleigh World Heritage Area, the "Encore" and "Cleft of Ages" sites. The sites of deposition are dated to period toward the end of the Middle or the beginning of the late Miocene.

References

Miocene marsupials
Fossil taxa described in 1996
Riversleigh fauna